The Chicago Boys were a group of Chilean economists prominent around the 1970s and 1980s, the majority of whom were educated at the Department of Economics of the University of Chicago under Milton Friedman and Arnold Harberger, or at its affiliate in the economics department at the Pontifical Catholic University of Chile. After they finished their studies and returned to Latin America, they adopted positions in numerous South American governments including, prominently, the military dictatorship of Chile (1973–1990), as economic advisors. Many of them reached the highest positions within those governments. While The Heritage Foundation credits them with transforming Chile into Latin America's best performing economy and one of the world's most business-friendly jurisdictions, critics point to drastic increases in unemployment that can be attributed to counter-inflation policies implemented on their advice. Ronald Reagan and Margaret Thatcher were influenced by Chile's policies and economic reforms.

History
The term "Chicago Boys" has been used at least as early as the 1980s to describe Latin American economists who studied or identified with the liberal economic theories then taught at the University of Chicago, even though some of them earned degrees at Harvard University or MIT. They advocated widespread deregulation, privatization, and other free market policies for closely controlled economies. The Chicago Boys rose to prominence as leaders of the early reforms initiated in Chile during General Augusto Pinochet's rule. Milton and Rose Friedman used the term "Chicago Boys" in their memoir: "In 1975, when inflation still raged and a world recession triggered a depression in Chile, General Pinochet turned to the "Chicago Boys"; he appointed several of them to powerful positions in the government.
 
The training program was the result of the "Chile Project" organized in the 1950s by the U.S. State Department, through the Point Four program, the first US program for global economic development. It was funded by the Ford Foundation and the Rockefeller Foundation aimed at influencing Chilean economic thinking. The University of Chicago's Department of Economics set up scholarship programs with Chile's Catholic University. About one hundred select students between 1957 and 1970 received training, first in an apprenticeship program in Chile and then in post-graduate work in Chicago.

The project was uneventful until the early 1970s. The Chicago Boys' ideas remained on the fringes of Chilean economic and political thought, even after a group of them prepared a 189-page "Program for Economic Development" called El ladrillo ("the brick"). It was presented in 1969 as part of Jorge Alessandri's unsuccessful presidential candidacy. Alessandri rejected El ladrillo, but it was revisited after the 1973 Chilean coup d'état on 11 September 1973 brought Augusto Pinochet to power, and it became the basis of the new regime's economic policy.

After the coup when the Chicago boys were given power and el ladrillo was implemented, the Chilean economy began to grow and expand at a rate much higher than that of other similar countries. This was seen as an economic miracle and gave these policies greater credibility worldwide. However, this has led to greater income inequality in Chile which is still an issue that raises concern.

These policies were seen as the natural reaction to Marxism and part of Chile's role as a hotspot during the Cold War. The anti-Marxist junta supported radical free market policies promoted by the Chicago Boys as a part of their destruction of Marxism.

After the end of the military rule and return to democracy this specific group lost power and many joined the private sector, although their policies and effects still remained in place in many areas.

Even though the Chile Project ended, the training connection between Chile and the University of Chicago continued. One of the numerous networking organizations for alumni, including the Chicago Boys, is the "Latin American Business Group at Chicago Booth School of Business" (LATAM). The term continues to be used in popular culture, business magazines, press and media. In 2015, a Chilean film titled Chicago Boys was released.

Shock Doctrine and Economic Policies 
As the key economic advisors of the Pinochet dictatorship, the Chicago Boys were the forerunners of the economic policies of that government. They sponsored state run policies to decrease national spending, end inflation and promote economic growth. They promoted a policy of strict austerity and cut government expenditures substantially. Free trade agreements and the breakdown of barriers to trade were also promoted to help Chile compete in the world market. They also privatized public companies, and utilized the free market rather than government rule to promote their economic policies. This was part of the neoliberal economic views espoused by Milton Friedman, the ideological backer for their views. Friedman and his connections to the Chicago Boys was highly politicized especially after he received the Nobel Prize for Economics in 1976. The policies are also sometimes referred to as shock therapy based on the fact that they were projected to hurt the economy but overall be beneficial in the long run. These policies influenced future governments and organizations tied to the neoliberal economic viewpoint such as the World Bank, International Monetary Fund, and other International Organizations and governments. However, the relations between these organizations were not always close, and rivalry between neoliberal organizations still existed. The ideology of free market capitalism and laissez faire economics in conjunction with a strong military rule and total political control is the cornerstone of Pinochetism, in conjunction with a strong anti-communist political platform. These policies and their effects are both highly controversial in Chile and around the World, and represent a major divide in Chilean politics to this day.

International Influence 
The economic success of the Chicago boys was a critical part of bolstering the Pinochet regime abroad. The Chilean miracle as it was called attracted a lot of necessary positive attention for the Pinochet government, and allowed Pinochet to exercise political repression without condemnation by economic allies. New policies such as structural adjustment, free trade, and tax cuts became incredibly popular with conservative political groups throughout the western world. These policies eventually spread into the United States and United Kingdom via their conservative leaders. Chile was one of the first countries to embrace these policies and they have since spread in part due to the initial success Chile experienced.

Notable Chicago Boys

Chile
Some of them are or were:

Jorge Cauas, Minister of Finance, 1975–1977.
Sergio de Castro, Minister of Finance, 1977–1982.
Pablo Baraona, Minister of Economy, 1976–1979.
José Piñera, Minister of Labor and Pensions, 1978–1980; Minister of Mining, 1980–1981. (Received M.A. and Ph.D. Economics at Harvard.)
Hernán Büchi, Minister of Finance, 1985–1989. (Received MBA at Columbia University.)
Alvaro Bardón, President of the Central Bank of Chile; Minister of Economy, 1982–1983.
Juan Carlos Méndez, Budget Director, 1975–1981.
Emilio Sanfuentes, Economic advisor to Central Bank of Chile.
Sergio de la Cuadra, President of the Central Bank of Chile; Minister of Finance, 1982.
Rolf Lüders, (Minister of Economy, 1982; Minister of Finance, 1982-83)
Francisco Rosende, Research Manager, Central Bank of Chile, 1985 and 1990; Antitrust Commission, 1999 and 2001; Dean and Professor of Economics, Faculty of Business and Economy of PUC, 1995–present.
Miguel Kast, Minister of Planning, 1978–1980; Labor Minister, 1980–1982; Governor of the Central Bank of Chile, 1982–83.
Martín Costabal, Budget Director, 1987–1989.
Juan Ariztía Matte, Pension Superintendent, 1980–1990.
Maria Teresa Infante, Minister of Labor, 1988–1990.
Camilo Carrasco Alfonso, General Manager of Central Bank, 1994–2005.
Joaquín Lavín, Minister of Education, 2010–2011; Minister of Planning, 2011–2013; Mayor of Las Condes, 2016–2021
Cristián Larroulet Vignau, Chief of Staff of the Finance Minister; member of National Commission for Privatization; Head of Antitrust Commission; Minister of General Secretariat to the Presidency, [SEGPRES] 2010–present; Executive Director at Libertad y Desarrollo, a private think tank; Dean and Professor of Economics; Faculty of Business and Economy at Universidad Del Desarrollo (UDD), Santiago, Chile; member of the boards of several public enterprises; member of the Mont Pelerin Society.
Juan Andrés Fontaine, Minister of Economy, 2010–2011.
Francisco Perez Mackenna, Chief Executive Officer of Quinenco, one of Chile's largest conglomerates, with assets of over US$33.1 billion 1998–present; Director of many Quinenco group companies, including Banco de Chile, Madeco, CCU, Inversiones y Rentas, LQIF, ECUSA, CCU Argentina and Banchile Corretores de Bolsa, and Advisor to the Board of Vina San Pedro Tarapaca; CEO of CCU, 1991–1998. (Received Business Administration degree from Universidad Catolica de Chile and M.B.A. from University of Chicago.
Ernesto Fontaine, Professor, Faculty of Economics and Administration, Pontificia Universidad Católica de Chile; returned to Chile financed by the Inter American Development Bank, 1976; chief of the "external financing unit," the Organization of American States (OAS), where he organized a Technical Assistance Program that trained teams of public officials in Project Preparation and Social Evaluation; World Bank consultant, Organization for Economic Co-operation and Development (OECD); died January 20, 2014, of lung cancer.
Ricardo Ffrench-Davis, called a "heterodox Chicago Boy" and an "anti Chicago Boy".

Elsewhere in Latin America
Although the largest and most influential group of so-called Chicago Boys was Chilean in origin, there were many Latin American graduates from the University of Chicago around the same period. These economists continued to shape the economies of their respective countries, and include people like Mexico's Sócrates Rizzo, Francisco Gil Díaz, Fernando Sanchez Ugarte, Carlos Isoard y Viesca, Argentina's Ruben D. Almonacid, Adolfo Diz, Roque Fernández, Carlos Alfredo Rodríguez, Fernando de Santibañes and Ricardo Lopez Murphy, Brazil's Paulo Guedes, as well as others in Peru, Colombia, Uruguay, Costa Rica, and Panama.

See also
Miracle of Chile
Berkeley Mafia
Jeffrey Sachs
John Perkins
Augusto Pinochet
Pinochetism
Universidad del Desarrollo
The Shock Doctrine

References

Further reading
Valdés, Juan Gabriel (1995), Pinochet's Economists: The Chicago School of Economics in Chile, Cambridge, Cambridge University Press. 
Constable, Pamela, and Arturo Valenzuela (1991), A Nation Of Enemies: Chile Under Pinochet, New York, W.W. Norton. 
Fontaine Aldunate, Arturo (1988), "Los Economistas y el Presidente Pinochet", Zig Zag.

External links
NPR Planet Money - The Chicago Boys Pt. 1
 NPR Planet Money - The Chicago Boys Pt. 2
PBS Video clip – Chicago Boys and Pinochet
Is Chile a Neoliberal Success? analysis of Chicago Boys' policies in Dollars & Sense magazine 2004
Forbes Magazine article 2010-3-17
Audio clip – 'Chicago Boys' Leave Lasting Legacy on Chile's Economy, National Public Radio

1970s in Chile
1980s in Chile
Economic history of Chile
Military dictatorship of Chile (1973–1990)
Neoliberalism
University of Chicago alumni
Chile–United States relations
20th-century Chilean economists
Chicago School economists